La Terre à boire is a Canadian drama film, directed by Jean-Paul Bernier and released in 1964. The film stars Genevieve Bujold, Pauline Julien, Patricia Nolin and Gilles Pelletier.

It had a budget of $65,000 and was the first Quebec film to be privately financed. It had difficulties with local censors.

References

External links

1964 films
Canadian drama films
1960s French-language films
Quebec films
1960s Canadian films